Marián Juhás (born 28 October 1979 in Košice) is a retired Slovak football defender who last played for club Pattaya United.

External links 
 Pattaya United profile

References

1979 births
Living people
Association football defenders
Slovak footballers
FC VSS Košice players
Perak F.C. players
Negeri Sembilan FA players
MFK Zemplín Michalovce players
Marian Juhas
Marian Juhas
Slovak Super Liga players
Expatriate footballers in Thailand
Expatriate footballers in Malaysia
Sportspeople from Košice
Slovak expatriate sportspeople in Thailand
Slovak expatriate sportspeople in Malaysia